Marika Susan Domanski-Lyfors (born 17 May 1960), née Marika Susan Domanski, is a Swedish football coach and former player. She was head coach of the Sweden women's national football team from September 1996 until June 2005 and also coached the China women's national football team during 2007. She is nicknamed Mackan.

As a Jitex BK player Domanski-Lyfors won two League Championships (1981 and 1984) and three Swedish Cups (1981, 1982 and 1984). All of Jitex's regular players except left-back Domanski-Lyfors were capped at international level, because national team coach Ulf Lyfors did not rate her as a player. Marika disputed Ulf's judgement, but forgave him to the extent that the two were later married and had son Joakim.

Her own nine-year spell in charge of the senior Sweden women's national football team was considered a success. The team were runners-up in UEFA Women's Euro 2001 and the 2003 FIFA Women's World Cup, beaten by Germany in the final of both competitions.

After returning to a role with the Sweden women's national under-21 team, Domanski-Lyfors accepted an offer to become head coach of the China women's national football team in March 2007. She oversaw an improvement in the team's results and guided the hosts to the quarter finals of the 2007 FIFA Women's World Cup.

At the tournament, the Chinese hosts engaged in surveillance and intimidation of first round opponents Denmark. Domanski-Lyfors and her assistant Pia Sundhage were unaware of the incidents and Danish coach Kenneth Heiner-Møller absolved them of any blame, although he refused to shake hands after the match.

The Chinese wanted Domanski-Lyfors to stay on for the 2008 Olympics, but she decided against extending her contract. In November 2007 she was appointed a technical director of the Swedish Football Association (SvFF).

Marika Domanski-Lyfors can be seen in the 2013 Sveriges Television documentary television series The Other Sport.

During her first international game as Swedish head coach, Sweden won against Italy, 1–0, in Torino on 9 October 1996.

References

External links

Profile at Swedish Football Association 

1960 births
Living people
Swedish women's footballers
1999 FIFA Women's World Cup managers
2003 FIFA Women's World Cup managers
2007 FIFA Women's World Cup managers
Jitex BK players
Örebro University alumni
China women's national football team managers
Sweden women's national football team managers
Damallsvenskan players
GAIS players
Swedish women's football managers
Swedish expatriate football managers
Swedish expatriate sportspeople in China
Expatriate football managers in China
Women's association football defenders
Female association football managers
Footballers from Gothenburg